Tristan Robert Morton (born 1989) is an English male lawn and indoor bowler. He bowls for Parkway Bowling Club.

Career
Morton has won four Men's National Championships titles. In 2010, he won the national pairs with Wayne Bailey and two years later in 2012, he won the National two wood singles title. Both titles were achieved while bowling for the White Hart Warboys BC. The third title came in 2017 when he was bowling for Parkway BC, he won the national triples with Mike Robertson and his brother Ean Morton.

In 2019, he won the pairs gold medal and team bronze medal at the European Bowls Championships. In 2022, he won the fours title at the 2022 Bowls England National Finals.

References

Living people
English male bowls players
1989 births
Bowls European Champions